Dmitriyevskaya is a rural locality (a village) in Bogorodskoye Rural Settlement, Ust-Kubinsky  District, Vologda Oblast, Russia. The population was 23 as of 2002.

Geography 
Dmitriyevskaya is located 66 km northwest of Ustye (the district's administrative centre) by road. Malaya Gora is the nearest rural locality.

References 

Rural localities in Tarnogsky District